Sanomalaite M/90 (SANLA) (Literally "Message device M/90") is a digital, portable and encrypted text-based communications device developed by Nokia and used by all branches of Finnish Defence Forces.

History
The development of the messaging system Sanomalaitejärjestelmä ("Message device system") that Sanomalaite M/90 belongs to was started in the 1970s and the system went operational in 1983. Sanomalaite M/90 is an upgraded version of the original SANLA which was released in 1983. The messaging system includes also Partiosanomalaite and Keskussanomalaite. There is also a version for air surveillance posts. (Ilmavalvontapääte) The main difference between this type and the others is that it includes reporting buttons for different types of aircraft. (Bomber, fighter, turboprop, jet etc.)

From 2013 onward, the devices are being replaced with Panasonic CF-U1 Toughbook tablet computers running Windows 7 Professional and several applications running on it, such as MATI (Maavoimien tietojärjestelmä) and artillery fire control system.

Features
Digital; transmits and receives messages as bursts
Uses radio or telephone connections
Message is sent encrypted to the memory of the receiving device
Fixed or freeform messages
Sending memory 8 x 2000 characters
Receiving memory for 9 messages
Maximum speed 600 bit/s
32-character display
55-button keyboard
Internal power source 6V
External power source 10-30V
Power usage about 1W / 6V
Can be connected to a computer or a printer
Weight about 3 kg
Country of origin Finland

External links

 http://www.mil.fi/maavoimat/kalustoesittely/index.dsp?level=81&equipment=137 (In Finnish, includes pictures)

References 

Military communications
Military equipment of Finland